Feylinia macrolepis is an African lizard in the family Scincidae commonly known as skinks. It is found in Republic of the Congo, and Central African Republic.

References

External links

Feylinia
Skinks of Africa
Taxa named by Oskar Boettger
Reptiles described in 1887
Western Congolian forest–savanna mosaic